Squilla mantis is a species of mantis shrimp found in shallow coastal areas of the Mediterranean Sea and the Eastern Atlantic Ocean: it is also known as "pacchero" or "canocchia". Its abundance has led to it being the only commercially fished mantis shrimp in the Mediterranean.

Description
It is generally dull brown in colouration, but has two brown eye spots, circled in white, at the base of the telson. Other species – including smashers – are also sold in the aquarium trade as Squilla mantis.

Distribution and ecology

S. mantis digs burrows in muddy and sandy bottoms near the coasts of the Mediterranean Sea and adjacent warm parts of the eastern Atlantic Ocean. It remains in its burrow during the day and comes out at night to hunt, and in the winter to mate.

It is found around the entire coast of the Mediterranean, and in the Atlantic Ocean south from the Gulf of Cádiz to Angola, as well as around the Canary Islands, and Madeira. It has historically been recorded from the Bay of Biscay and the British Isles, but is not known to occur there any more. It is particularly abundant where there is significant run-off from rivers, and where the substrate is suitable for burrowing. In the Mediterranean, the outflows from the Nile, Po, Ebro and Rhône provide these conditions.

The alpheid shrimp Athanas amazone often lives in the burrows of S. mantis, despite being of a similar size to other shrimp which S. mantis feeds on. The relationship between the two species remains unknown, although a second similar case has been reported for the species Athanas squillophilus in the burrows of Oratosquilla oratoria in Japanese waters.

Fishery

S. mantis is the only native stomatopod to be fished for on a commercial scale in the Mediterranean. Over 7,000 t is caught annually, 85% of which is caught on Italian shores of the Adriatic Sea, with further production in the Ionian Sea, off Sardinia, off the coast of Catalonia and off the Balearic Islands. Outside the Mediterranean, it is consumed in Andalusia in the Gulf of Cadiz under the name of "galeras".

References

External links

Stomatopoda
Crustaceans of the Atlantic Ocean
Edible crustaceans
Commercial crustaceans
Crustaceans described in 1758
Taxa named by Carl Linnaeus